Hans Konrad Schumann (often anglicized to Hans Conrad Schumann in English-language sources; 28 March 1942 – 20 June 1998) was an East German border guard who escaped to West Germany during the construction of the Berlin Wall in 1961.

Early life
Born in Zschochau (now part of Ostrau, Saxony) during World War II, Schumann enlisted in the East German Grenzpolizei (border police) following his 18th birthday. After three months' training in Dresden, he was posted to a non-commissioned officers' college in Potsdam, after which he volunteered for service in Berlin.

Escape to West Germany

On 15 August 1961, the 19-year-old Schumann was sent to the corner of Ruppiner Strasse and Bernauer Strasse to guard the Berlin Wall on its third day of construction. He and his unit arrived at 4:30 am, where an officer ordered them to take control and protect the border "against the enemies of socialism." Schumann later recalled: "We stood around looking pretty stupid at first. Nobody had told us how that's done: taking control of a border."

At that time and place, the wall was only a single coil of concertina wire. Throughout the day, as Schumann paced ten steps up and down, West Berlin residents shouted catcalls. "You pigs!" "You traitors!" "You concentration camp guards!"

One scene particularly upset Schumann. A young lady in East Berlin passed a bouquet of flowers over the top of the wire to an older lady in West Berlin, obviously the younger lady's mother, and wished her a happy birthday. The young lady apologized for not being able to visit, then motioned to Schumann and added, "Those [people] over there, they won't let me cross anymore." Schumann started to reconsider whether he really wanted to spend the rest of his working life keeping his fellow citizens imprisoned.

Around noon, a West Berlin crowd of about 1,000 demonstrators approached the wire at Schumann's post. They shouted various slogans, including "Freiheit (Freedom)." Schumann recalled: "Suddenly the mass of people moved toward us like a living wall. I thought: they're going to run over us right away. I was nervous and didn't know what to do. I didn't want to shoot and I wasn't supposed to."

Before Schumann was forced to act, more soldiers arrived in armoured cars and pushed the crowd back with rifles fixed with bayonets.

Schumann started to think that he should leave, especially after trucks arrived with concrete posts and steel plates. Over the next two hours, when no other soldier was watching, he pushed down the same section of wire. West Berlin bystanders started to take notice. One young man came close and Schumann yelled at him "Get back at once", then whispered "I'm going to jump!" The young man alerted the West Berlin police, who arrived with a van.

At roughly 4:00 pm, Schumann jumped over the barbed wire while dropping his PPSh-41 submachine gun, and was promptly driven away in the van by West Berlin police. West German photographer Peter Leibing photographed Schumann's escape. The photograph, entitled Leap into Freedom, has since become an iconic image of the Cold War era and featured at the beginning of the 1982 Disney film Night Crossing. The scene, including Schumann's preparations, was also filmed on 16 mm film from the same perspective by camera operator Dieter Hoffmann.

Schumann went from West Berlin to West Germany, settling in Bavaria. In 1962, he met and married Kunigunde Gunda in Günzburg. They had a son the following year. Schumann took up a new job at a winery and later at the Audi car factory in Ingolstadt, where he worked for nearly 30 years.

Later life and death

During his time in West Germany, Schumann feared that the Stasi would try to assassinate him, but this never happened.

After the fall of the Berlin Wall Schumann said, "Only since 9 November 1989 [the date of the fall] have I felt truly free." Even so, he continued to feel more at home in Bavaria than in his birthplace, citing old frictions with his former colleagues, and was even hesitant to visit his parents and siblings in Saxony. When he returned to East Germany after the reunification to visit his relatives, he was rejected by them. They saw him as a traitor who abandoned his family.

On 20 June 1998, suffering from depression, he committed suicide, hanging himself in his orchard near the town of Kipfenberg in Upper Bavaria. His body was found by his wife a few hours later.

In May 2011, the photograph of Schumann's "leap into freedom" was inducted into the UNESCO Memory of the World programme as part of a collection of documents on the fall of the Berlin Wall.

Monument

A sculpture called Mauerspringer ("Walljumper") by Florian and Michael Brauer and Edward Anders can be seen close to the site of the defection, but has since been moved to the side of a building on Brunnenstraße, several meters south of Bernauer Straße.

Literature 
 Christoph Links: Schumann, Konrad. In: Wer war wer in der DDR? 5. Ausgabe. Band 2, Ch. Links, Berlin 2010, .

Motion pictures 
 The 1982 Walt Disney movie Night Crossing's pre-opening credits scenes includes footage of Schumann's escape before the Wall's completion.

See also 
 List of Soviet and Eastern Bloc defectors
 List of photographs considered the most important

References

External links 
 

1942 births
1998 deaths
People from Riesa
Suicides by hanging in Germany
East German defectors
Berlin Wall
Black-and-white photographs
National People's Army personnel
East German emigrants to West Germany
People notable for being the subject of a specific photograph
1961 works
1961 in art
1960s photographs
1998 suicides
Military personnel from Saxony